Elizabeth Powell was a Texas colonist who received a land grant for a league of land (4428 acres) from the Mexican government in present day Powell Point, Fort Bend County, Texas, on the waters of the San Bernard River and Turkey Creek.  Powell operated a boarding house and bar that was a popular stop considering there were not many establishments in early Texas.

Santa Anna's troops camped at Elizabeth Powell's boarding house before and after the Battle of San Jacinto. She had not fled with the Runaway Scrape and was there on April 10, 1836 and to witness the arrival of Urrea's army on April 20, the event is documented in the journals of the soldiers who camped there.  On April 24, she was forced to house the generals, as they planned the Mexican army's retreat. On April 26, they set fire to her house and outbuildings as the army departed.

Her homesite marks the most westward advance of Santa Anna's troops.  There is a historical marker at this site that was erected by the state of Texas in 1936; however, it is on private property.

Elizabeth Powell and her family were instrumental in early Texas history and well connected with other early Texas families.  One local historian even suggests that the song, "The Yellow Rose of Texas", was written for her.  There is no extant proof to support this claim.

Children
Her son, Samuel Graves Powell, was a famous steamboat captain that operated on his ship, the Betty Powell, up and down the Brazos River.  The ship was named for his wife, Elizabeth Sheppard, whom he married in Matagorda County.
Her daughter, Julia Powell, was married to Charles Doane, who was an infamous police official in early San Francisco.
Her daughter, Elizabeth, married Isaac McGary (and later divorced him), who fought in the Battle of San Jacinto.  Isaac's granddaughter (from his second wife), was instrumental in founding the University of Texas at Austin.

References

Pamela A. Puryear and Nath Winfield, Jr., Sandbars and Sternwheelers: Steam Navigation on the Brazos (College Station: Texas A&M University Press, 1976)
Clarence Wharton, Wharton's History of Fort Bend County (San Antonio: Naylor, 1939)

People from Fort Bend County, Texas
Pre-statehood history of Texas